Heavenly may refer to:

 Pertaining to Heaven

Music

Bands
 Heavenly (British band), an English pop band
 Heavenly (French band), a French heavy metal band

Albums
 Heavenly (Johnny Mathis album), 1959
 Heavenly (L'Arc-en-Ciel album), 1995
 Heavenly, a 1997 album by Ladysmith Black Mambazo

Songs
 "Heavenly", a song by The Dandy Warhols from the 2003 album Welcome to the Monkey House
 "Heavenly", a song by Pale Waves from the 2018 EP All the Things I Never Said
 "Heavenly", a song by The Temptations from the 1973 album 1990

Other uses 
 Heavenly Planet, a proposed world music festival in Reading, England
 Heavenly Recordings, a British independent record label
 Heavenly Mountain Resort, a ski resort located on the California–Nevada border near Lake Tahoe
 Heavenly Hiraani Tiger Lily Hutchence-Geldof, daughter of the late Michael Hutchence (1960–1997) and the late Paula Yates (1959–2000)
 Heavenly Group Ltd, a full service branding agency based in London

See also
 Heaven (disambiguation)